Oliva flammulata, common name the flame olive, is a species of sea snail, a marine gastropod mollusk in the family Olividae, the olives.

Subspecies
 Oliva flammulata dolicha Locard, 1897
 Oliva flammulata flammulata Lamarck, 1811

Description
The length of the shell varies between 22 mm and 43 mm.

Distribution
This species occurs in the Atlantic Ocean off the Cape Verdes, Mauritania and Angola.

References

External links
 

flammulata
Taxa named by Jean-Baptiste Lamarck
Gastropods described in 1811
Molluscs of the Atlantic Ocean
Molluscs of Angola
Gastropods of Cape Verde
Invertebrates of West Africa